"Animal Instinct" is a song performed by former DSDS-contestant Annemarie Eilfeld under the pseudonym Annemie. It was the first single from her debut studio album "I'm Burning Up". It was produced and published by the German record company x-cell records and was released on 11 May 2010 in Germany as a digital download, and on 14 May 2010 as a 2-track CD single.

Background and release
Eilfeld gained fame when she took part at German casting show Deutschland sucht den Superstar (DSDS), the German version of the Idol-franchise, in 2009. Though she made it to third place, she didn't want to get a contract with manager Volker Neumüller or producer Dieter Bohlen. Instead she decided to work on her music career on her own and signed to label x-cell records on 1 September that year. During the recording and producing of "Animal Instinct" she worked with Detlef D! Soost, a choreographer from the German edition of Popstars. The video of this song was released exclusively on tape.tv on 21 April 2010.

Track listing

2-Track Single
"Animal Instinct" (Original Version) – 4:05
"Animal Instinct" (Scotty Clubmix) – 6:29

German Download Single
"Animal Instinct" (Original Version) – 4:03
"Animal Instinct" (Scotty Clubmix) – 6:29
"Animal Instinct" (Andrew Spencer vs. Aquagen Remix) – 5:41
"Animal Instinct" (Extended Version) – 5:27

Charts

References

2010 singles
Songs written by Kay Denar
Songs written by Rob Tyger
2010 songs
X-Cell Records singles